The Davao Regional Medical Center (DRMC) is a training government hospital in the Philippines. It was established in 1969 as the Davao del Norte National Hospital in Tagum. In 1992, now known as the Davao Regional Hospital, the bed capacity was increased from over 150 to 200. In 2015, the hospital further increased its capacity to 600 beds and became known under its current name.

References

Buildings and structures in Tagum
Hospitals in the Philippines